Nuestra Belleza Estado de México 2012, was held at Mambocafé of Metepec, Estado de México on July 14, 2012. At the conclusion of the final night of competition Laura Villalobos from Metepec was crowned the winner. Villalobos was crowned by Nuestra Belleza Estado de México 2011 Nohemí Hermosillo. Ten contestants competed for the title.

Results

Placements

References

External links
Official Website

Estado de Mexico, 2012
Nuestra Belleza, 2012
2012 in Mexico